Phycodes substriata is a moth in the family Brachodidae. It was described by Walsingham in 1891. It is found in Tanzania (Zanzibar).

References

Natural History Museum Lepidoptera generic names catalog

Endemic fauna of Tanzania
Brachodidae
Moths described in 1891